Ada County is located in the southwestern part of Idaho, United States. As of the 2021 United States census estimate, the county had a population of 511,931, making it by far the state's most populous county; it is home to 26.8% of the state's population. The county seat and largest city is Boise, which is also the state capital. Ada County is included in the Boise metropolitan area. The Ada County Highway District has jurisdiction over all the local county and city streets, except for private roads and state roads. In the interior Pacific Northwest east of the Cascade Range, Ada County ranks second in population, behind Spokane County, Washington.

History
Ada County was created by the Idaho Territory legislature on December 22, 1864, partitioned from Boise County. It is named for Ada Riggs, the daughter of H.C. Riggs, a member of the legislature; he established the county and was a co-founder of Boise. Canyon County, which originally included Payette County and most of Gem County, was partitioned from western Ada County in 1891.

Geography
The Boise River flows through the northern portion of the county, and the northwest border is bounded by the foothills of the Boise Range mountains; the summits are in adjacent Boise County. The southwestern border of the county is bounded by the Snake River.

Adjacent counties

 Gem County - northwest
 Boise County - northeast
 Elmore County - east
 Owyhee County - south
 Canyon County - west

Major highways

  - Interstate 84
  - Interstate 184
  - US 20
  - US 26
  - US 30
  - SH-16
  - SH-21 - Ponderosa Pine Scenic Byway
  - SH-44
  - SH-55 - Payette River Scenic Byway
  - SH-69

County roads and highways are maintained by the Ada County Highway District.

National protected areas
 Boise National Forest (part)
 Snake River Birds of Prey National Conservation Area (part)

Demographics

2000 census
As of the 2000 United States census, there were 300,904 people, 113,408 households, and 77,344 families in the county. The population density was 285/mi2 (110/km2). There were 118,516 housing units at an average density of 112/mi2 (43/km2). The racial makeup of the county was 92.86% White, 0.65% Black or African American, 0.69% Native American, 1.74% Asian, 0.15% Pacific Islander, 1.67% from other races, and 2.24% from two or more races. Hispanic or Latino of any race were 4.48% of the population.

There were 113,408 households, out of which 36.20% had children under the age of 18 living with them, 55.10% were married couples living together, 9.40% had a female householder with no husband present, and 31.80% were non-families. 23.80% of all households were made up of individuals, and 6.07% had someone living alone who was 65 years of age or older. The average household size was 2.59 and the average family size was 3.11.

The county population contained 27.30% under the age of 18, 10.30% from 18 to 24, 32.50% from 25 to 44, 20.80% from 45 to 64, and 9.10% who were 65 years of age or older. The median age was 33 years. For every 100 females, there were 100.6 males. For every 100 females age 18 and over, there were 98.9 males.

The median income for a household in the county was $46,140, and the median income for a family was $54,416. Males had a median income of $37,867 versus $26,453 for females. The per capita income for the county was $22,519. About 5.40% of families and 7.70% of the population were below the poverty line, including 9.20% of those under age 18 and 5.70% of those age 65 or over.

2010 census
As of the 2010 United States census, there were 392,365 people, 148,445 households, and 99,282 families in the county. The racial makeup of the county was 90.3% white, 2.4% Asian, 1.1% black or African American, 0.7% American Indian, 0.2% Pacific islander, 2.4% from other races, and 2.8% from two or more races. Those of Hispanic or Latino origin made up 7.1% of the population. In terms of ancestry, 19.4% were German, 15.9% were English, 11.8% were Irish, and 8.6% were American.

Of the 148,445 households, 35.6% had children under the age of 18 living with them, 52.4% were married couples living together, 10.0% had a female householder with no husband present, 33.1% were non-families, and 25.0% of all households were made up of individuals. The average household size was 2.58 and the average family size was 3.11. The median age was 34.8 years.

The median income for a household in the county was $55,835 and the median income for a family was $67,519. Males had a median income of $48,290 versus $34,875 for females. The per capita income for the county was $27,915. About 6.9% of families and 10.2% of the population were below the poverty line, including 11.8% of those under age 18 and 6.8% of those age 65 or over.

Government and politics
Ada County has traditionally been rather conservative for an urban county. Like Idaho as a whole, it has long been a Republican Party stronghold. The last victory in a presidential election by a Democrat in Ada County was by Franklin D. Roosevelt in 1936. It rejected Lyndon B. Johnson in 1964 during his 44-state landslide. In 2008 the presidential election in Ada County was more competitive than in previous years; John McCain defeated Barack Obama by six percentage points. Obama became the first Democrat to garner as much as 40 percent of the county's vote since Lyndon B. Johnson. In 2016, Donald Trump won the county by only a plurality due to high third party performance. In 2020, whereas the state of Idaho trended very strongly for Trump, he carried Ada County by a slim majority, only beating Joe Biden by around 4 percentage points. This is the narrowest election in decades for Ada County, and the closest a Democrat has come to carrying the county since 1940.

Democratic gubernatorial nominee Jerry Brady carried the county in his 2002 and 2006 races, despite losing statewide in both contests. Another prominent Democrat, Boise mayor David Bieter, was elected in 2007, 2011 and 2015.

Ada County is split between the first and second congressional districts; it is the only county in the state that is not located entirely within one district. As of 2022, the first district is represented by Russ Fulcher and includes Meridian, Eagle and Kuna, while the second district is represented by Mike Simpson and includes most of Boise proper. Both Fulcher and Simpson are Republicans.

In the Idaho Legislature, Ada County is split among nine districts, the most of any county. Each district elects one state senator and two state representatives. As of 2022, In the state senate, Republicans hold five seats and Democrats hold four. In the state house, Republicans hold ten seats and Democrats hold eight. Generally, Democratic strength is concentrated in Boise itself, while Republican strength is concentrated in the western suburbs. Several of the Boise seats were Democratic pickups in 2006.

Each party held all of their respective legislative seats in the 2008 elections, but Republicans won two competitive county commission races.

County offices
The county government is administered by the Ada County Board of Commissioners, a three-member legislative body. Other elected officials include clerk, treasurer, sheriff, assessor, coroner, and prosecutor.

The Idaho Department of Correction operates the South Boise Prison Complex, a correctional facility located in unincorporated Ada County, south of the Boise Airport and east of Kuna.

Education

Public school districts
School districts include:
 Boise School District
 Kuna Joint School District 3
 Melba Joint School District 136
 West Ada School District (Meridian Joint School District 2)

Communities

Cities

 Boise
 Eagle
 Garden City
 Kuna
 Meridian
 Star

Census-designated places
 Avimor
 Hidden Springs

Unincorporated communities

 Mora
 Pleasant Valley
 Sonna

Population ranking
The population ranking of the following table is based on the 2010 census of Ada County.

† county seat

See also

 List of counties in Idaho
 National Register of Historic Places listings in Ada County, Idaho

References

Further reading

External links
 

 
Idaho counties
1864 establishments in Idaho Territory
Boise metropolitan area
Populated places established in 1864